An American may be the pseudonym of:

 Samuel Adams (1722–1803), American statesman
 William Cobbett (1763–1835), English journalist
 James Fenimore Cooper, American novelist
 Alexander Hamilton (1757–1804), American lawyer and statesman
 Henry Wadsworth Longfellow, American poet

See also
 American (disambiguation)
 An American Gentleman, pseudonym of Washington Irving